Gray is a commune in the Haute-Saône department, region of Bourgogne-Franche-Comté, eastern France. It has a population of 5,553 inhabitants (2019).

Geography
Gray is situated on the banks of the river Saône. It is the last major town in Haute-Saône before the Saône flows into Côte-d'Or.

History
In the Middle Ages it was an important river port and trading center in Franche-Comté.

Gray is believed to have acquired its name from an old landed estate in its vicinity owned by a family with Gallo-Roman origins bearing the name "Gradus", a cognate of the Celtic "Grady" meaning "illustrious" or "noble".

Population

Sights
The town includes many old buildings. An 18th century stone bridge spans the Saône river, connecting the main town with the settlement of Arc-lès-Gray. Gray is a popular place for fishing and various water activities.

Gray's Basilica (Basilique Notre Dame) was built from 1478 to 1559, with a bell tower typical of Franche-Comté.

An art museum, the Musée Château Baron Martin, is housed in the Château of the Count of Provence, brother of Louis XVI, which in the 18th century replaced the fortress belonging to the Dukes of Burgundy. The 12th century "Paravis Tower" is the last remnant of the fortress and offers a panoramic view of the Saône Valley. The museum displays some 1200 pieces of art from the 15th to the 20th century throughout 24 rooms.

The Carmelite chapel (Chapelle des Carmelites) was built in 1667. Since 1978, it has held eight centuries of sacred art in Haute-Saône, including paintings, sculptures, and religious objects.

Gray is the site of France's National Esperanto Museum.

Transport
There is a bus station.

See also
Communes of the Haute-Saône department

References

Communes of Haute-Saône